The 2012–13 Scottish Cup was the 128th season of Scotland's most prestigious football knockout competition. The tournament began on 4 August 2012 and ended on 26 May 2013. It was sponsored by bookmaker William Hill in the second season of a three-year partnership and is known as the William Hill Scottish Cup. The winner of the competition qualified for the third qualifying round of the 2013–14 UEFA Europa League. The holders Hearts were knocked out by their Edinburgh rivals Hibernian in the fourth round, in a repeat of the previous season's final.

Format and Calendar

Due to an increase in the number of participating teams, there was a preliminary round involving four teams. Thirty four other clubs from the Highland League, qualifying Junior clubs and other clubs affiliated with the Scottish Football Association were given a bye to the first round proper. Third Division clubs enter in the second round, while Second Division and some First Division clubs start in the third round. The remaining First Division and all Scottish Premier League (SPL) clubs enter in the fourth round (last 32). The fourth round was played in early December 2012, to allow SPL clubs a brief winter shutdown in January.

For the first time in its history, the Scottish Cup Final was due to be played on a Sunday. This is to comply with UEFA regulations which prohibit televised matches being played on the same day as the UEFA Champions League Final. The 2012 Scottish Cup Final was played on the same day as the 2012 UEFA Champions League Final, but this was done under a one-year waiver offered by UEFA. Fixture congestion meant that the 2013 Scottish Cup Final could not be moved to an earlier weekend.

The calendar for the 2012–13 competition is as follows:

Preliminary round

The preliminary round draw was conducted on 3 July 2012 at Hampden Park, Glasgow.

This round is contested entirely by non-league clubs:
 Fifteen SFA full member clubs from the Highland Football League: (Brora Rangers, Buckie Thistle, Clachnacuddin, Deveronvale, Formartine United, Fort William, Fraserburgh, Huntly, Inverurie Loco Works, Keith, Lossiemouth, Nairn County, Rothes, Turriff United and Wick Academy)
 Twelve SFA full member clubs from the East of Scotland League: (Burntisland Shipyard, Civil Service Strollers, Coldstream, Edinburgh City, Edinburgh University, Gala Fairydean, Hawick Royal Albert, Preston Athletic, Selkirk, Spartans, Vale of Leithen, Whitehill Welfare)
 Four SFA full member clubs from the South of Scotland League: (Newton Stewart, St Cuthbert Wanderers, Threave Rovers, Wigtown & Bladnoch)
 Three SFA full member clubs in other leagues: (Girvan, Glasgow University, Golspie Sutherland)
 Four qualifiers from the Scottish Junior Football Association: (Bonnyrigg Rose Athletic, Hermes, Irvine Meadow, Shotts Bon Accord)

Thirty four clubs received a bye into the first round.

First round

The first round draw took place on 23 July 2012 at the Queen Anne Suite, Edinburgh Castle, at 2:00pm.

This round was contested by the winners of the two preliminary round ties plus the thirty four clubs who received a bye in the preliminary round.

First round Replays

Second round

The second round draw took place on 27 August 2012. All ten teams from the Third Division were added to the competition at this stage, along with the champions of the South of Scotland League (Dalbeattie Star) and East of Scotland League (Stirling University), and the champions and runners-up from the Highland League (Forres Mechanics and Cove Rangers).

Second round Replays

Third round
Sixteen teams joined in the 3rd round: all ten current Second Division clubs, along with 6th to 8th in last season's First Division (Partick, Raith and Morton) and the three teams that were promoted from last season's Second Division (Cowdenbeath, Dumbarton and Airdrie United).

Third round Replays

Fourth round
The Fourth round draw was conducted on 5 November 2012 at 2:30pm at Hampden Park live on Sky Sports News.

The 16 winners from the third round entered here, along with the 12 SPL clubs and four SFL First Division clubs who were exempt from playing in the third round (Dunfermline Athletic, Falkirk, Hamilton Academical, Livingston).

|goals2 =
|stadium = Easter Road, Edinburgh
|referee = Calum Murray
|attendance = 17,052
}}

Fourth round Replays

Fifth round
The Fifth round draw was conducted on 3 December 2012 at 1:00pm at Hampden Park live on Sky Sports News.

Quarter-finals
The Quarter-finals draw was conducted on 3 February 2013 at 5:45pm at Easter Road Stadium live on Sky Sports 2.

Semi-finals
The Semi-finals draw was conducted on 4 March 2013 at 1:30pm at Hampden Park live on Sky Sports News.

Final

Awards
The Scottish Cup Player of the Round was decided by the fans, who cast their vote to choose a winner from a list of nominations on the official Scottish Cup Facebook page.

Media coverage
From round four onwards, selected matches from the Scottish Cup are broadcast live in Ireland and the UK by BBC Scotland and Sky Sports. BBC Scotland has the option to show one tie per round with Sky Sports showing two ties per round with one replay also. Both channels will screen the final live.

These matches were broadcast live on television.

References

External links

Official Site
2012–13 Scottish Cup at ESPN
2012–13 Scottish Cup at Soccerway

Scottish Cup seasons
1
Scottish Cup